Scolesa is a genus of moths in the family Saturniidae erected by Charles Duncan Michener in 1949.

Species
Scolesa hypoxantha (W. Rothschild, 1907)
Scolesa leucantha (Boisduval, 1872)
Scolesa nebulosa Lemaire, 1971
Scolesa totoma (Schaus, 1900)
Scolesa viettei Travassos, 1959
Scolesa vinacea (W. Rothschild, 1907)

References

Ceratocampinae